Thomas Goodwin (born ) is an American politician and businessman who served as a member of the New Jersey Senate from the 14th legislative district. Selected on March 11, Goodwin succeeded Bill Baroni, who had resigned to take a role in Governor Chris Christie's administration. He was sworn in on March 15, 2010, and sought re-election in a special June primary and November general election. He was defeated for election to a full term in November 2010 by Assemblywoman Linda R. Greenstein.

Early life and education
Goodwin was born in Trenton, New Jersey and moved to Hamilton Township when he was eight years old. He attended township public schools and graduated from Hamilton High School West. He earned an associate degree from Mercer County Community College, and received designations as Chartered Life Underwriter and Chartered Financial Consultant from The American College in Bryn Mawr, Pennsylvania.

Career

Hamilton Township Council
In 2005, Goodwin was elected to the Hamilton Township Council, defeating the Democratic candidate Wayne DeAngelo. He ran against DeAngelo and fellow Democrat Linda R. Greenstein in 2007 for the State Assembly from the 14th legislative district but lost by fewer than 800 votes. He successfully defended his seat on the Hamilton Council in 2009 and was named Council President.

New Jersey State Senate
On February 19, 2010, Governor Chris Christie announced that he was appointing State Senator Bill Baroni to the position of Deputy Executive Director of the Port Authority of New York and New Jersey. Goodwin announced on March 1 that he would seek to fill the vacancy left by Baroni's resignation. At a March 11 special election convention held by the Republican committees of Mercer and Middlesex counties, Goodwin defeated former Assemblywoman Barbara Wright by a vote of 75–31. He was sworn in on March 15.

Goodwin was a successful candidate for re-election in the June Republican primary. He lost to Assemblywoman Linda R. Greenstein in the general election.

References

External links
Legislative web page, New Jersey Legislature
Senator Tom Goodwin's Official Site

1951 births
Living people
Hamilton High School West alumni
Republican Party New Jersey state senators
People from Hamilton Township, Mercer County, New Jersey
Politicians from Trenton, New Jersey
The American College of Financial Services alumni
21st-century American politicians